Bhakta Kumbara is a 1974 Indian Kannada-language biographical film directed by Hunsur Krishnamurthy. The film stars Rajkumar and Leelavathi. Actress Sridevi essayed the role of Muktha Bai (as a child artist), thereby the latter making her Kannada film debut. The film was produced by N. R. Anuradha Devi under Lakshmi Film Combines. Bhakta Kumbara marked the eighth collaboration between Dr. Rajkumar and director Hunsur Krishnamurthy.

The movie is based on the life of Gora Kumbhar, a potter turned into a saint who lived in the 13th and 14th centuries in Teredoki village. He supposedly lost his child while curing the clay by his legs for making pots, because he did not notice his child fumbling under his feet as he immersed himself in chanting the name of God. He was called Saint Gora Kumbara  by the people of Maharashtra.

The film won three awards at the 1974-75 Karnataka State Film Awards - Third Best Film, Best Actor (Rajkumar) for his portrayal of the potter-turned-saint Gora Kumbhar and Best Music Director (G. K. Venkatesh). The movie saw a theatrical run of 175 days and was declared a Blockbuster at the box office. Bhakta Kumbara is the second Kannada film based on the life of Gora Kumbhar with the first being Gora Kumbara(1960). The movie was dubbed in Hindi as Bhakti Main Bhagwan. The movie was remade in Telugu in 1977 by V. Madhusudhana Rao as Chakradhari starring Akkineni Nageswara Rao. G. K. Venkatesh was the music director of the Telugu version as well and he retained four songs from the Kannada version.

Cast 

 Rajkumar as Gora 
 Leelavathi as Gora's wife
 Rajashankar as St. Namadev
 Balakrishna as Gora's Neighbor
 Vajramuni as Krishna, Gora's relative
 Dwarakish as Gora's neighbor
 Kanchana
 M. N. Lakshmi Devi
 Ramesh as Lord Panduranga/Gora's caretaker
 Thoogudeepa Srinivas as Village head
 Manjula as Gora's Sister in law
 Sampath as Gora's Father in law
 Shanimahadevappa as St. Gnanadev
 H. R. Shastry
 Joker Shyam
 Sridevi as Muktha Bai, St. Namadeva's sister

Soundtrack
The music of the film was composed by G. K. Venkatesh with lyrics penned by Hunsur Krishnamurthy and Chi. Udaya Shankar.

4 songs from this movie were retained in its Telugu remake Chakradhari which also had music composition by G. K. Venkatesh.
Manava Dehavu Moole Mamsada Thadike  was retained as Mavava Amunnadi Deham 
Vitala Vitala Panduranga Vitala  was retained as Vitala Panduranga Vitala  
Hari Namave Chanda  was retained as Harinamame Madhuram 
Kande Hariya Kande  was retained as Kanugontini Harini

Track list

References

External links
 
 

1974 films
1970s Kannada-language films
Indian biographical films
Kannada films remade in other languages
Films scored by G. K. Venkatesh
Films set in the 13th century
Films set in the 14th century
1970s biographical films
Films directed by Hunsur Krishnamurthy